Zhegao railway station is a railway station in Chaohu City, Hefei, Anhui, China.

This station has two platforms and two bypass tracks.

History 
The station opened with the second phase of the Shangqiu–Hangzhou high-speed railway on 28 June 2020.

References 

Railway stations in Anhui
Railway stations in China opened in 2008